The 1992 The Citadel Bulldogs football team represented The Citadel, The Military College of South Carolina in the 1992 NCAA Division I-AA football season. The Bulldogs were led by sixth-year head coach Charlie Taaffe and played their home games at Johnson Hagood Stadium. They played as members of the Southern Conference, as they have since 1936.

The Citadel claimed its second SoCon championship, their first since 1961.  They spent four weeks as the top ranked team in the nation and played in the I-AA playoffs for the third time in five years.  They also won 11 games, most in school history, and the only time a Bulldog football team has won more than eight games in a season.  Their playoff win was the first postseason victory for the Bulldogs since the 1960 Tangerine Bowl.

The Bulldogs defeated two teams from Division I-A for the first time since the SoCon became a Division I-AA league.  Wins over Arkansas and Army marked high points in the season.  The victory over Arkansas to open the season resulted in the Razorbacks' head coach Jack Crowe stepping down.  This was Arkansas' first game as a member of the Southeastern Conference.

After the win over Arkansas, Sports Illustrated published a story critical of The Citadel and its military environment, particularly its effects on athletes.  It contained several accounts of hazing, most notably of a freshman kicker who missed a field goal that would have won the 1991 game against Wofford.  The story created a firestorm on campus and potential distractions for the team, as several current players were named in the article.

Schedule

Preseason
The Bulldogs were picked to finish fifth in the eight team SoCon by league media.

Game summaries

Arkansas

The Citadel opened the 1992 season at Arkansas, which had joined the Southeastern Conference prior to the 1992 NCAA Division I-A football season.  The Razorbacks returned 14 starters from a 1991 team that went to a bowl game and was considered "legitimate contenders for the SEC title."  Arkansas had not lost a home opener on campus since 1906, going 42–0–3 since a loss to Chilocco Indian Agricultural School, while The Citadel had lost 19 of 20 road openers, the lone win against Navy in 1989.  The two teams had never met in football, and The Citadel's only wins over SEC teams were over Vanderbilt in 1962 and 1979.

Both teams were scoreless through three quarters, as each team missed a field goal as the second quarter wound down.  Late in the third quarter, the Bulldogs drove to the Arkansas 25–yard line before QB Jack Douglas fumbled a pitch to Eric Little, which the Razorbacks recovered on their 24–yard line.  They drove to The Citadel 8–yard line, where they faced fourth down and one yard to go.  As fans booed, the Razorbacks sent out their field goal unit for a 25–yard kick by Todd Wright to take a 3–0 lead early in the 4th quarter.  The Citadel was unable to move past midfield on their ensuing possession and were forced to punt.  On a second and four play from the Razorbacks 31, RB E. D. Jackson took a handoff up the middle where he was met by Bulldogs DE Garrett Sizer, knocking the ball loose.  Citadel DE Judson Boehmer recovered the fumble behind the line of scrimmage, and taking advantage of a rule change for 1992 returned it for a touchdown.  The Razorbacks took over after the kickoff on their 31, and on the third play QB Jason Allen threw a pass that was intercepted by Bulldog CB Detric Cummings.  Douglas led the Bulldogs to the 8–yard line, and Jeff Trinh connected on a 25–yard field goal with 3:28 remaining to take a 10–3 lead.  Arkansas threatened on their next possession, but were unable to convert from The Citadel 27–yard line, and the Bulldogs ran the final 1:21 off the clock to seal the win.  This was the Bulldogs fifth win over a Division I-A team in their previous six tries.

As a team, the Bulldogs gained 218 yards on the ground and 276 yards overall.  Douglas rushed 26 times for 82 yards and finished 5 of 7 in the air for 58 yards.  RB Everette Sands carried 11 times for 51 yards.  The Razorbacks gained 287 yards, 177 of them on the ground, with Jackson carrying 29 times for a career-high 167 yards and Allen completing 11 of 23 attempts for 110 yards and one interception.  The Citadel fumbled four times, losing two, while Arkansas fumbled three times, losing one.  The Bulldogs converted 8 of 15 third down attempts, while the Razorbacks converted only 4 of 13.  The Citadel won the time of possession battle, holding the ball for 33:13.

After the game, Razorbacks coach Jack Crowe resigned.  He was succeeded by Defensive Coordinator Joe Kines.

Wofford

The Bulldogs faced Division II Wofford in their home opener.  The previous season, the Terriers had upset The Citadel at Johnson Hagood Stadium, with freshman kicker Chad Davis missing three field goals.  The story surrounding Davis provided key information for Rick Reilly's article on the Fourth-Class System that was published in the week leading up to the 1992 Wofford game.  The key storyline for the week included these distractions and the emotional high of the win over Arkansas, arguably the Bulldogs biggest win as a program.  The Terriers were coming off a disappointing 41–27 loss at NAIA power Elon.

Both teams were scoreless in the first quarter, and The Citadel took over at their own 27 yard line after a Wofford punt early in the second quarter.  Driving 73 yards on 13 plays, Sands scored on a 2–yard run to put the Bulldogs up 7–0.  Wofford responded with their own 73–yard drive later in the quarter to tie the game.  The Bulldogs took over on the ensuing kickoff at their own 40 yard line and went 60 yards for a Cedric Sims touchdown and a lead they would not relinquish.  Jeff Trinh added a 36–yard field goal as the half expired for a 17–7 lead.  Early in the third quarter, Jack Douglas was intercepted by CB Chad Starks, giving Wofford momentum.  Five plays later, CB Torrance Forney recorded his second interception of Wofford QB Shawn Graves, this time near the end zone.  The Citadel then 98 yards on 17 plays in nearly 8 minutes to take a commanding 23–7 lead.  The Bulldogs would recover a fumble in their own territory on the next possession, and drive 72 yards on 7 plays for a fourth touchdown later in the fourth quarter.  Wofford scored the final points of the game after a four play, 72-yard drive late in the fourth quarter.

Sands rushed for 117 yards on 25 carries while Douglas carried 16 times for 95 yards and threw for 92 more en route to the 30–13 win.  Wofford senior QB Shawn Graves rushed for 149 yards and a touchdown, causing Taaffe to remark, "I'm glad we don't have to play him again."  The Citadel defense shut down the Terriers in the air, with Graves completing just one of ten passes for 12 yards and three interceptions.  The Bulldogs gained 441 yards to just 288 for Wofford.  Taaffe was particularly pleased with the performance in light of all the distractions of the week.  Citadel fans were particularly excited about score updates from the Arkansas game at South Carolina, in which the Razorbacks routed the Gamecocks 45–7.

East Tennessee State

The Citadel opened SoCon play against East Tennessee State, which entered at 2–0, 1–0 in conference play.  The Buccaneers had defeated VMI 18–16 in their opener at home, and then beat NAIA Mars Hill 21–0 in their first shutout since 1984.  ETSU had yet to play a road game.

Army

In its second game against a team from Division I-A, The Citadel traveled to Army.

Appalachian State

The Citadel travelled to face defending SoCon champion Appalachian State.  The Bulldogs had dealt the Mountaineers their only loss in league play in 1991.

Chattanooga

Marshall

In a highly anticipated matchup, the undefeated #4 Bulldogs faced 4–1 and #5 Marshall at Johnson Hagood Stadium.  Marshall's only loss was to I-A Missouri, and had won each of their four games against I-AA competition in convincing fashion, with the smallest margin of victory being 18 against VMI.  The matchup matched the SoCon statistical leaders in several team categories, such as scoring offense vs scoring defense, total offense vs total defense, passing offense vs passing defense, and rushing offense vs rushing defense.  The game was the first pre-announced sellout in Johnson Hagood Stadium history, and just the second since the stadium was constructed in 1948.

Despite a record crowd of 23,025, the Bulldogs fell 34–13.

Western Carolina

Newberry

VMI

The Bulldogs won their ninth game of the season, securing the largest number of wins in program history.  After Jeff Trinh missed two of his first three extra point attempts, freshman John Cahill replaced him on extra points and connected on all four of his attempts.  This was Cahill's first collegiate appearance.

Furman

The Bulldogs clinched the Southern Conference championship with the win over Furman, for their second title in program history.

Division I-AA Playoffs: North Carolina A&T

Division I-AA Playoffs: Youngstown State

Roster

Honors and awards
The following awards were bestowed at the end of the season:
 Eddie Robinson Award – Charlie Taaffe
 AP All-Americans – Carey Cash, Lester Smith
 Walter Camp All-Americans – Carey Cash, Terrence Forney, Lance Hansen, Lester Smith
 The Sports Network All-Americans – Carey Cash, Lance Hansen, Lester Smith

Ranking movements

References

Citadel Bulldogs
The Citadel Bulldogs football seasons
Southern Conference football champion seasons
Citadel football